Pauliina Feodoroff (born 1977 in Inari, Finland) is a Finnish Skolt Sámi film director, theater director, screenwriter, and Sápmi advocate. An active advocate of Sámi culture and Sámi rights, she has served as Chair of the Saami Council.

Biography
Pauliina Feodoroff was born in Inari in 1977. Her family was involved in reindeer husbandry. She graduated from the Helsinki Theatre Academy's degree program in directing and dramaturgy in 2002. Feodoroff's first feature film, Non Profit, made on a budget of €20,000 and taking ten years to produce, premiered at the Skabmagova-Kaamos Festival in Inari in January 2007. She was awarded the Kritiikin Kannukset (Critique Award) for this film. In 2009, Feodoroff became Artistic Director of Theater Takomo with Milja Sarkola. 

Feodoroff's advocacy in uploading traditional Skolt Sámi society and culture includes issues regarding land and water rights. She has served as the Chair of the Sámi Council for a two-year period during 2007–2008.

Awards
In 2012, Feodoroff won the Theatre Academy's Alumnus/Alumna award for artists, pedagogues, or other professionals for their outstanding achievement in theatre together with Milja Sarkola.

Filmography
2003 Saamen kadonnut maa
2006 Viimeinen joiku Saamenmaan metsissä? 
2007 Kiurrels
2007 Sevetin tytöt
2008 Non Profit
2016 Sparrooabbán ("Me and My Little Sister")

References

Sources
 Kervinen, Elina, ”Pohjolan kuvaaja”, Suomen Kuvalehti 46/2008
 Moring, Kirsikka, ”Joiku vaihtui rapiksi, porot biteiksi”, Helsingin Sanomat 30.1.2007

1977 births
Living people
People from Inari, Finland
Finnish Sámi people
Finnish film directors
Finnish women film directors
Finnish theatre directors
Finnish screenwriters
21st-century Finnish women writers
21st-century screenwriters
Finnish women screenwriters
Finnish LGBT screenwriters
LGBT Sámi people